Xu Fenlin (born July 1953) is a retired general (shangjiang) of the Chinese People's Liberation Army who served as Deputy Chief of the Joint Staff from 2016 to 2017. Prior to that, he was the final Commander of the Guangzhou Military Region between 2009 and 2016, before its abolition in January 2016.

Biography
Xu Fenlin was born in July 1953 in Jintan County, Jiangsu in July 1953. He has a bachelor's degree in economics and management from the Central Party School of the Chinese Communist Party. He attained the rank of major general in July 2002, lieutenant general in July 2008, and full general in July 2013.

Xu served as Chief-of-Staff of the Guangzhou Military Region from 2007 to 2009, and was promoted to Commander in 2009. He stayed in the role for some six years, before being transferred to the Joint Staff to serve as deputy chief.

He was an alternate member of the 17th Central Committee of the Chinese Communist Party and a full member of the 18th Central Committee.

References

1953 births
Living people
People's Liberation Army generals from Jiangsu
People from Jintan District
Commanders of the Guangzhou Military Region
Alternate members of the 17th Central Committee of the Chinese Communist Party
Members of the 18th Central Committee of the Chinese Communist Party